Kim Jong-kyu (김종규, born 2 March 1958) is a Korean former wrestler who competed in the 1984 Summer Olympics.

References

External links
 

1958 births
Living people
Olympic wrestlers of South Korea
Wrestlers at the 1984 Summer Olympics
South Korean male sport wrestlers
Olympic silver medalists for South Korea
Olympic medalists in wrestling
Asian Games medalists in wrestling
Wrestlers at the 1978 Asian Games
Wrestlers at the 1982 Asian Games
Medalists at the 1984 Summer Olympics
Universiade medalists in wrestling
Asian Games silver medalists for South Korea
Asian Games bronze medalists for South Korea
Medalists at the 1978 Asian Games
Medalists at the 1982 Asian Games
Universiade bronze medalists for South Korea
20th-century South Korean people
21st-century South Korean people